Avoca is a neighborhood of Louisville, Kentucky centered along Aiken Road and Chenoweth Run watershed.

References
  

Neighborhoods in Louisville, Kentucky